First Street station or 1st Street station

 First Street (IRT Second Avenue Line), a demolished elevated train station in New York City
 First Street station (Miami), a Metromover station in Miami
 1st Street station (Los Angeles Metro), a Los Angeles Metro station
 1 Street Southwest station, a light rail station in Calgary, Alberta
 First Street station (Oakland), a demolished Southern Pacific Railroad station in Oakland, California

See also
First Street (disambiguation)